The WCPW Midget Championship was a professional wrestling midget title in Windy City Pro Wrestling (WCPW). Originally, WCPW was known as Windy City Wrestling (WCW), however, a lawsuit brought by World Championship Wrestling forced the smaller promotion to change its name to "Windy City Pro Wrestling" in 1997. The championship remained active until 2001 when it was discontinued.

The inaugural champion was Little Tokyo, who defeated Cowboy Cottrell at a live event in Chicago, Illinois on January 1, 1988 to become the first WCW Midget Champion. Little Tokyo and Lone Eagle both hold the record for most reigns, with two each. At 1,758 days, Little Tokyo's first reign was the longest in the title's history. Chris Cruz's only reign was the shortest in the history of the title lasting only 85 days. Overall, there have been 8 reigns shared between 6 wrestlers, with two vacancies, and 1 deactivation.

Title history
Key

Names

Reigns

List of combined reigns

See also
Midgets' World Championship
NWA World Midget's Championship
NWL Midget Championship

Notes

References

External links
WindyCityProWrestling.com
Title History - Windy City Pro Wrestling

Midget Championship
Midget wrestling championships